Betty Hill may refer to:

 Betty Hill (activist) (18761960), American civil rights and women's rights leader
 Betty Hill (tennis), American tennis player in the 1927 Wightman Cup
 Betty Hill (politician) (Margaret Elizabeth "Betty" Hill, 19372013), Canadian politician
 Barney and Betty Hill, American couple who claimed to have been kidnapped by extraterrestrials in 1961

See also 

 Elizabeth Hill (disambiguation)
 Hill (surname)